John Murphy (born December 15, 1984) is an American former professional cyclist, who competed between 2004 and 2020, for six different teams.

Career
In 2010 he competed at (amongst others) the Gent–Wevelgem and the 93rd Giro d'Italia. In 2009 he became the United States National Criterium Champion. In 2012, Murphy signed a contract with the  team.

After retiring from professional cycling in 2020 John joined Gulo Composites as their Brand Manager.

Major results

2008
 1st  Overall Tour de Taiwan
1st Points classification
 1st Stage 4 Fitchburg Longsjo Classic
 2nd Overall Nature Valley Grand Prix
2009
 1st  National Criterium Championships
2010
 6th Nokere Koerse
2011
 6th Omloop van het Houtland
 6th ProRace Berlin
2012
 2nd Overall Tour of Elk Grove
 5th Philadelphia International Championship
 10th Tour of the Battenkill
2013
 3rd Overall Tour of Elk Grove
2014
 1st  Mountains classification Danmark Rundt
2015
 1st  Overall Joe Martin Stage Race
1st  Points classification
1st Stages 2 & 3
 1st Stage 7 USA Pro Cycling Challenge
2016
 1st Stage 3 Tour de Langkawi
 1st Stage 4 Herald Sun Tour
 9th Overall Joe Martin Stage Race
2017
 1st White Spot / Delta Road Race
 1st Stage 1 Colorado Classic
 1st Stage 4 Tour of Utah
2018 
 1st Stage 1 Circuit des Ardennes
 9th Overall Tour de Normandie

References

External links

John Murphy's profile on Cycling Base

American male cyclists
1984 births
Living people
Sportspeople from Jacksonville, Florida